The shamsa was a ceremonial crown that formed part of the regalia of the Abbasid and Fatimid caliphates. It consisted of a gigantic suspended crown made of gold or silver and studded with pearls and precious stones. It was based on the ceremonial crown that was similarly suspended over the head of the Sasanian king. Under the Abbasids, the shamsa symbolically represented the absent caliph during the official hajj observances while the amir al-hajj was personally in charge of the pilgrim caravan. Once the pilgrims had reached Mecca, the shamsa would be hung up in front of the ka'ba during the hajj ceremonies.

Several different shamsas are known to have been made. The first was commissioned by the Abbasid caliph al-Mutawakkil in the mid-9th century and later inlaid with precious stones by al-Mu'tadid half a century later. It was eventually carried off by the Qarmatian leader Abu Tahir al-Jannabi during the 924 Hajj caravan raid. The second was made by the Egyptian regent Abu al-Misk Kafur for the Ikhshidid prince Unujur; after the Fatimid conquest of Egypt, their general Jawhar had it replaced with a new, bigger one. Jawhar's shamsa was lost when the Fatimid treasury was looted in 1068; a fourth, unfinished shamsa was also taken at the same time.

References 

Regalia
Individual crowns
Abbasid Caliphate
Fatimid Caliphate
History of the Hajj